New Welsh Review is a literary magazine published in Wales. Its primary language is English, with brief excerpts of texts indicated in the original Welsh.

History
Founded in 1988 as successor to The Welsh Review (1939–1948), Dock Leaves, and The Anglo-Welsh Review (1949–1988), New Welsh Review is Wales's foremost literary magazine in English. It publishes articles on literature, theatre, and the arts, as well as interviews, reviews, original short stories, and poetry.

From the time its initial issues were published, New Welsh Review has been central to the Welsh literary scene. Its focus is on Welsh writing in English, but the journal's outlook also features broad UK and international contexts. Contributors include some of the greatest Welsh and international writers and thinkers: Dannie Abse, Paul Muldoon, P. D. James, Emyr Humphreys, Leslie Norris, Gwyneth Lewis, Les Murray, Rachel Trezise, Niall Griffiths, Owen Sheers, Terry Eagleton, Edna Longley, Byron Rogers, Gillian Clarke and Paul Groves.

The magazine is published quarterly in Aberystwyth with core financial support from the Welsh Books Council. In addition, it receives sponsorship from Aberystwyth University, the University of Glamorgan, and Cardiff University.

Editors
 1988–1991 Belinda Humfrey
 1991 Micheal Parnell (died five months after becoming editor)
 1991–2001 Robin Reeves
 2001–2002 Victor Golightly
 2002–2008 Francesca Rhydderch
 2008–2011 Kathryn Gray
 2011– Gwen Davies

References

External links
 New Welsh Review website

1988 establishments in Wales
Literary magazines published in Wales
Magazines established in 1988
Quarterly magazines published in the United Kingdom